The Burt Award for First Nations, Inuit and Métis Literature is a Canadian literary award, presented annually to works judged to be the best works of young adult literature published by indigenous writers in Canada. The award is sponsored by the Canadian Organization for Development through Education (CODE), a Canadian charitable organization devoted to literacy and education, and philanthropist William Burt, and administered by the Canada Council. Several other organizations, including the Assembly of First Nations, the Métis National Council, Inuit Tapiriit Kanatami, the National Association of Friendship Centres and the Association of Canadian Publishers, are also involved in the award's administration.

Announced in 2012, the award was presented for the first time in 2013.

The award presents a first prize of $12,000, a second prize of $8,000 and a third prize of $5,000 annually. In addition to the prize money, CODE purchases 2,500 copies of each of the prize-winning titles, for free distribution to indigenous community libraries, schools and community centres across Canada as part of the foundation's literacy program.

In June 2019, CODE announced that in addition to the existing award for English language literature, it will be expanded to incorporate a second award for works published in indigenous languages.

Winners

References

External links
Burt Award for First Nations, Métis and Inuit Literature

Canadian fiction awards
First Nations literary awards
Awards established in 2012
2012 establishments in Canada
Young adult literature awards
Canadian non-fiction literary awards
Inuit literature